Maria Vasilievna Rozanova (born 27 December 1929, Vitebsk, Russian SFSR) is a publisher, editor, and Soviet-era dissident.

Rozanova graduated from the Moscow State University. In the Soviet Union, she worked as a tour guide, and taught at the Gerasimov Institute of Cinematography and the Abramtsevo Art College. In 1973, following the release of her husband, writer Andrei Sinyavsky, from Soviet prison camps, the couple and their son, Iegor Gran, left the USSR for Paris, France. For many years, Rozanova served as the chief editor of Sintaksis, a literary journal.

References

1929 births
Russian editors
Russian women editors
Soviet dissidents
Living people
People from Vitebsk
Moscow State University alumni
Soviet emigrants to France
Women jewellers